Admiral Essen is a frigate of the  of the Russian Navy named in honour of Admiral Nikolai Ottovich von Essen. The ship construction begun at the Yantar Shipyard in Kaliningrad in July 2011 and it was launched in November 2014. It is based with the Black Sea Fleet at Sevastopol.

Service

Russian military intervention in the Syrian civil war 

In May and September 2017, in the course of the Russian military campaign in Syria, Admiral Essen fired Kalibr cruise missile at targets in the Hama and Deir ez-Zor regions, respectively.

On 25 August 2018, the Black Sea Fleet reported Admiral Essen, along with its sister ship , were making a "planned passage from Sevastopol to the Mediterranean Sea" to join the Russian Navy's Mediterranean task force.

2022 Russian invasion of Ukraine 

During the 2022 Russian invasion of Ukraine the ship was involved in cruise missile strikes against Odesa.

According to an advisor to the Ukrainian President's Office, Oleksiy Arestovich, on 3 April 2022 the ship was allegedly seriously damaged by Ukrainian Armed Forces as a result of an attack using an initially unspecified weapon system, later reported as being a R-360 Neptune anti-ship cruise missile.

On 12 April 2022, Russian Defence Ministry released a video showing Admiral Essen allegedly destroying a Ukrainian Bayraktar TB2 UAV off the coast of Crimea, using two missiles of the Shtil-1 surface-to-air missile system. No video of an impact or wreckage were provided.

References

Frigates of the Russian Navy
Admiral Grigorovich-class frigates
2014 ships
Ships built at Yantar Shipyard
Ships involved in the 2022 Russian invasion of Ukraine